This is a list of religious buildings in Paris, organized by religion and then by arrondissement (administrative division or district).

Buddhism 
12th arrondissement:
 Pagode de Vincennes, in the Bois de Vincennes
 13th arrondissement:
 Two pagodas in the Asian quarter

Christianity

Anglican Communion

American Cathedral in Paris, 8th arrondissement
St George's Church (Church of England), 16th arrondissement
St Michael's Church (Church of England), 8th arrondissement

Antoinism

13th arrondissement:
Temple of 34, rue Vergniaud
17th arrondissement:
Temple of 10, passage Roux
19th arrondissement:
Temple of 49, rue du Pré-Saint-Gervais

Armenian Apostolic Church

 8th arrondissement:
 Armenian Cathedral of St. John the Baptist

Armenian Catholic Church
 3rd arrondissement:
 , 6 ter

Catholic Church
 1st arrondissement:
 Église Notre-Dame-de-l'Assomption
 Église Saint-Eustache
 Église Saint-Germain-l'Auxerrois
 Église Saint-Leu-Saint-Gilles
 Église Saint-Roch
 Sainte-Chapelle

 2nd arrondissement:
 Église Notre-Dame-de-Bonne-Nouvelle
 Basilique Notre-Dame-des-Victoires
 Église Saint-Sauveur (destroyed)
 3rd arrondissement:
 Église Saint-Denys-du-Saint-Sacrement
 Église Sainte-Élisabeth-de-Hongrie
 Église Saint-Nicolas-des-Champs

 4th arrondissement:
 Cathédrale Notre-Dame de Paris
 Église Notre-Dame-des-Blancs-Manteaux
 Église Saint-Gervais-Saint-Protais
 Église Saint-Louis-en-l'Île
 Église Saint-Merri (Paris)
 Église Saint-Paul-Saint-Louis

 5th arrondissement:
 Église Notre-Dame du Liban (Maronite Catholic Church)
 Église Notre-Dame du Val-de-Grâce
 Église Saint-Éphrem-le-Syriaque (Syriac Catholic Church)
 Église Saint-Étienne-du-Mont
 Église Saint-Jacques-du-Haut-Pas
 Église Saint-Julien-le-Pauvre (Melkite Greek Catholic Church)
 Église Saint-Médard
 Église Saint-Nicolas-du-Chardonnet (occupied by SSPX)
 Église Saint-Séverin

 6th arrondissement:
 Église Notre-Dame-des-Champs
 Église de Saint-Germain-des-Prés
 Église Saint-Ignace
 Église Saint-Joseph-des-Carmes
 Église Saint-Sulpice
 Chapelle Saint-Vincent-de-Paul

 7th arrondissement:
 Chapelle Notre-Dame-du-Bon-Conseil (linked to the parish Saint-François-Xavier)
 Chapelle Notre-Dame-de-la-médaille-miraculeuse
 Basilique Sainte-Clotilde
 Église Saint-François-Xavier
 Église Saint-Louis des Invalides
 Église Saint-Pierre-du-Gros-Caillou
 Église Saint-Thomas-d'Aquin

 8th arrondissement:
 Chapelle Notre-Dame de Consolation
 Église de la Madeleine
 Église Saint-André-de-l'Europe (Paris)
 Église Saint-Augustin
 Église Saint-Joseph (Anglophone mission)
 Église Saint-Philippe-du-Roule
 9th arrondissement:
 Église Notre-Dame-de-Lorette
 Église Saint-Eugène-Sainte-Cécile
 Église Saint-Louis-d'Antin
 Chapelle Sainte-Rita (linked to the parish of the Église de la Sainte-Trinité)
 Église de la Sainte-Trinité

 10th arrondissement:
 Église Saint-Joseph-Artisan
 Église Saint-Laurent
 Église Saint-Martin-des-Champs
 Église Saint-Vincent-de-Paul
 11th arrondissement:
 Église du Bon-Pasteur (Paris)
 Église Notre-Dame-d'Espérance
 Église Notre-Dame-du-Perpétuel-Secours
 Église Saint-Ambroise
 Église Saint-Joseph-des-Nations
 Église Sainte-Marguerite

 12th arrondissement:
 Église de l'Immaculée-Conception
 Église Notre-Dame-de-la-Nativité de Bercy
 Chapelle Notre-Dame-de-la-Paix de Picpus
 Église Saint-Antoine-des-Quinze-Vingts
 Église Saint-Éloi
 Église Saint-Esprit
 13th arrondissement:
 Église Notre-Dame-de-Chine
 Chapelle Notre-Dame-de-la-Sagesse
 Église Notre-Dame de la Gare
 Église Saint-Albert-le-Grand
 Église Saint-Hippolyte
 Église Saint-Jean-des-Deux-Moulins
 Église Saint-Marcel
 Église Sainte-Anne de la Butte-aux-Cailles
 Église Sainte-Rosalie

 14th arrondissement:
 Église Notre-Dame-du-Rosaire
 Église Notre-Dame-du-Travail
 Église Saint-Dominique
 Chapelle Saint-François du couvent Saint-François de Paris (7, rue Marie-Rose)
 Église Saint-Joseph-de-Cluny
 Église Saint-Pierre-de-Montrouge

 15th arrondissement:
 Église Notre-Dame-de-l'Arche-d'Alliance
 Église Notre-Dame-de-Nazareth
 Église Notre-Dame-de-la-Salette
 Église Saint-Antoine-de-Padoue
 Chapelle Saint-Bernard-de-Montparnasse
 Église Saint-Christophe-de-Javel
 Église Saint-Jean-Baptiste de Grenelle
 Église Saint-Jean-Baptiste-de-La-Salle
 Église Saint-Lambert de Vaugirard
 Église Saint-Léon

 16th arrondissement:
 Église Saint-Albert-le-Grand (German mission)
 Église Notre-Dame-de-l'Assomption-de-Passy
 Église Notre-Dame-d'Auteuil
 Église Notre-Dame-de-Grâce-de-Passy
 Chapelle Notre-Dame du Saint Sacrement
 Église Saint-François-de-Molitor
 Église Saint-Honoré-d'Eylau
 Église Saint-Pierre-de-Chaillot
 Église Sainte-Jeanne-de-Chantal
 Eglise catholique russe de la Sainte Trinité (Byzantine Catholic)

 17th arrondissement:
 Église Notre-Dame-de-Compassion
 Chapelle Notre-Dame de la Confiance
 Église Saint-Charles-de-Monceau
 Église Saint-Ferdinand-des-Ternes
 Église Saint-François-de-Sales
 Église Saint-Joseph-des-Épinettes
 Église Saint-Michel des Batignolles
 Église Sainte-Marie des Batignolles
 

 18th arrondissement:
 Basilique du Sacré-Cœur de Montmartre
 Basilique Sainte-Jeanne-d'Arc
 Église Notre-Dame-du-Bon-Conseil
 Église Notre-Dame de Clignancourt
 Église Saint-Bernard de la Chapelle
 Église Saint-Denys de la Chapelle
 Église Saint-Jean-de-Montmartre
 Église Saint-Pierre de Montmartre
 Église Sainte-Geneviève des Grandes Carrières
 Église Sainte-Hélène

 19th arrondissement:
 Église de Marie-Médiatrice-de-Toutes-les-Grâces ou Sanctuaire Notre-Dame-de-Fatima
 Église Notre-Dame-de-l'Assomption-des-Buttes-Chaumont
 Église Notre-Dame-des-Foyers
 Église Sainte-Claire
 Église Sainte-Colette-des-Buttes-Chaumont
 Église Saint-François-d'Assise
 Église Saint-Georges de la Villette
 Église Saint-Jacques-Saint-Christophe de la Villette
 Église Saint-Jean-Baptiste de Belleville
 Église Saint-Luc

 20th arrondissement:
 Église du Cœur-Eucharistique-de-Jésus
 Église Notre-Dame-de-la-Croix de Ménilmontant
 Église Notre-Dame-de-Lourdes
 Église Notre-Dame-des-Otages
 Chapelle Saint-Charles de la Croix-Saint-Simon
 Église Saint-Cyril Saint-Méthode
 Église Saint-Gabriel
 Église Saint-Germain-de-Charonne
 Église Saint-Jean-Bosco

Christian Science
8th arrondissement:
Reading room, 38 rue Turin
16th arrondissement:
Second Church of Christ Scientist, 58 bd Flandrin

The Church of Jesus Christ of Latter-day Saints
4th arrondissement:
 Church of 12 rue St Merri
19th arrondissement:
 Church of 66 rue Romainville

Eastern Orthodox Church

 5th arrondissement:
 Paroisse Notre Dame Joie des Affligés et Sainte Geneviève
 Église des Saints-Archanges
 6th arrondissement:
 Paroisse Sainte-Parascève et Sainte-Geneviève
 8th arrondissement:
 Cathédrale Saint-Alexandre-Nevski
 9th arrondissement:
 Église des Saints-Constantin-et-Hélène
 11th arrondissement:
 Église Sainte-Marguerite
 13th arrondissement:
 Église Saint-Irénée
 15th arrondissement:
 Église de la Présentation-de-la-Vierge-au-Temple
 Église Saint-Séraphin-de-Sarov
 Église exarcale des Trois-Saints-Hiérarques
 Église de l'Apparition-de-la-Vierge
 16th arrondissement:
 St. Stephen's Greek Orthodox Cathedral
 Église de Tous-les-Saints-de-la-Terre-Russe
 Paroisse de l'Apparition de la Vierge
 18th arrondissement:
 Église Serbe Saint-Sava
 19th arrondissement:
 Église Saint-Serge

Evangelical Lutheran Church

 4th arrondissement:
 Église des Billettes
 5th arrondissement:
 Église Saint-Marcel
 7th arrondissement:
 Église de Saint-Jean
 9th arrondissement:
 Temple de la Rédemption
 11th arrondissement:
 Église du Bon-Secours
 15th arrondissement:
Église de la Résurrection
Église Saint-Sauveur
 17th arrondissement:
 Église de l'Ascension
 Église suédoise de Paris
 18th arrondissement:
 Église Saint-Paul
 19th arrondissement:
 Église Saint-Pierre

New Apostolic Church
11th arrondissement:
Church of 60 rue Trousseau

Reformed churches

 1st arrondissement:
 l'Oratoire du Louvre
 4th arrondissement:
 Temple du Marais
 5th arrondissement:
 Église réformée Maison Fraternelle
 Église réformée de Port-Royal
 7th arrondissement:
 Temple de Pentemont
 8th arrondissement:

 Église écossaise de Paris
 Église réformée Saint-Esprit
 10th arrondissement:
 Église réformée La Rencontre
 11th arrondissement:
 Église réformée du Foyer de l'Âme
 14th arrondissement:
 Plaisance Montparnasse
 16th arrondissement:
 Église réformée d'Auteuil
 Église réformée de l'Annonciation
 17th arrondissement:
 Église réformée des Batignolles
 Église réformée d'Étoile
 20th arrondissement:
 Église réformée de Belleville
 Église réformée de Béthanie

Salvation Army
 11th arrondissement:
 Palais de la Femme, 94 Rue de Charonne, 75011 Paris
 14th arrondissement:
 Paris Corps, 9 Villa Cœur de Vey, 75014 Paris

Seventh-day Adventist Church
13th arrondissement:
Church of 130 bd Hôpital:

Ukrainian Catholic Church
Cathedral of Saint Volodymyr the Great, 6th arrondissement

United and uniting churches

 7th arrondissement:
American Church in Paris (Protestant)
 9th arrondissement:
 Christuskirche, Paris, German Protestant Church in Paris

Hinduism
18th arrondissement:
 Temple Sri Manika Vinayakar Alayam or Temple de Ganesh

Islam 

 5th arrondissement:
 Grande Mosquée de Paris
 10th arrondissement:
 Mosquée 'Ali Ibn Al Khattab
 Centre culturel islamique
 Mosquée Ali ben abi Taleb
 Mosquée El Fatih
 11th arrondissement:
 Mosquée Abou Bakr As Saddiq
 Mosquée Abou Ayoub Al Ansari
 Mosquée Omar Ibn Khattab
 Mosquée Attaqwa
 Mosquée Alhouda
 12th arrondissement:
 Mosquée Attawbah
 13th arrondissement:
 Mosquée Othman
 14th arrondissement:
 Mosquée de la Maison de Tunisie
 Mosquée de la Maison du Maroc
 15th arrondissement:
 Mosquée de la Ligue islamique mondiale
 18th arrondissement:
 Mosquée AbdelMajid
 Mosquée Khalid Ibn El Walid
 Mosquée Al-Fath
 19th arrondissement:
 Mosquée A Daawa
 20th arrondissement:
 Mosquée des Comoriens

Judaism 

Synagogues: 
 Grand Synagogue of Paris (Orthodox; 9th arr't)
 Montmartre Synagogue
 Synagogue de Nazareth (Orthodox; 3rd arr't)
 Synagogue de la rue des Tournelles
 Synagogue Charles Liché
 Synagogue de la rue Pavée
 Synagogue Adath Israël
 Synagogue Adas Yereim
 Synagogue Rashi
 Synagogue de la Rue Bourg-Tibourg
 Synagogue du 17 Rue des Rosiers
 Synagogue du 25 Rue des Rosiers
 Synagogue Vauquelin
 Synagogue Ambroise-Thomas
 Synagogue Saint-Lazare
 Synagogue Buffault
 Synagogue Don Isaac Abravanel
 Synagogue Chasseloup-Laubat
 Synagogue Copernic (Reform; 16th arr't)
 Synagogue Saint-Isaure (see 'Montmartre Synagogue' above)
 Synagogue des Saules
 Synagogue kedouchat Levi
 Synagogue Secrétan
 Synagogue Julien-Lacroix
 Synagogue de Belleville

See also

Architecture of France
Religion in France
List of historic churches in Paris

References

External links

 Catholic churches in Paris
Information on top churches in Paris

Paris

Paris-related lists